Xu Youzhi (Chinese:许有志; Pinyin: Xǔ Yǒuzhì; born 13 December 1987) is a Chinese football player who currently plays for Nanjing Balanta in the Chinese Champions League.

Club career
Xu started his professional football career with Chongqing Lifan in 2008. On 3 April, he made his Super League debut in the third round of the season which Chongqing Lifan lost to Tianjin Teda 2–0, coming on as a substitute for Liu Jialin in the 91st minute. After Dutch manager Arie Haan took over the club, Xu became the regular player of the team in June. He made 22 appearances in the 2009 league season, however, Chongqing finished the last place of the league and relegated to China League One. In February 2010, the club were allowed to stay within the 2010 Chinese Super League after it was discovered that two Super League clubs Chengdu Blades and Guangzhou F.C. were guilty of match-fixing. Xu lost his position and didn't play for the club in 2010 as Chongqing stayed in the relegation zone at the end of the season. In July 2011, Xu made a brief trial with Belgian Second Division side K.S.K. Heist but could not stay due to the disagreement of transfer fee. He made 8 appearances in the 2011 China League One.

On 16 January 2012, Chinese Super League side Jiangsu Sainty announced that they had signed Xu with an undisclosed fee. He made his debut for Jiangsu on 8 July, in a 2–2 home draw against Shanghai Shenhua, coming on as a substitute for Jiang Jiajun in the 79th minute. He made just 4 appearances (103 minutes in total) in the 2012 league season as the club achieved runners-up in the league and gained the entry into their first AFC Champions League. He was sent to the reserved team in 2017 and 2018.

Career statistics 	
Statistics accurate as of 1 November 2016

Honours

Club	
Jiangsu Sainty	
 Chinese FA Cup: 2015
 Chinese FA Super Cup: 2013

References

1987 births
Living people
Footballers from Qingdao
Chinese footballers
Chongqing Liangjiang Athletic F.C. players
Jiangsu F.C. players
Chinese Super League players
China League One players
Association football defenders